The Watch is a fantasy police procedural television programme inspired by the Ankh-Morpork City Watch from the Discworld series of fantasy novels by Terry Pratchett. The series, developed by BBC Studios for BBC America, premiered on 3 January 2021 and was released on BBC iPlayer on 1 July 2021.

Setting and plot

The series is inspired by the Ankh-Morpork City Watch from the Discworld series of fantasy novels by Terry Pratchett. Set in the fictional Discworld's principal city of Ankh-Morpork, The Watch was described by Terry Pratchett in 2012 as a "Pratchett-style CSI"; it was to have an episodic storyline, following the format of a "crime of the week" as tackled by the city's police force under the command of Sam Vimes. In 2018, Narrativia described it as a "punk rock thriller".

Cast 

Sam Adewunmi as Carcer Dun
Matt Berry as voice of Wayne, a sword
Anna Chancellor as Lord Vetinari
Marama Corlett as Corporal Angua von Überwald, of the City Watch
Richard Dormer as Captain Sam Vimes, of the City Watch
James Fleet as the Archchancellor of Unseen University
Adam Hugill as Constable Carrot Ironfoundersson, newest member of the  City Watch
Ralph Ineson as the voice of Sergeant Detritus, of the City Watch
Hakeem Kae-Kazim as Captain John Keel
Paul Kaye as Inigo Skimmer
Joni Ayton-Kent as Corporal Cheery Littlebottom, Forensic officer of the City Watch
Ruth Madeley as Throat
Bianca Simone Mannie as Wonse
Ingrid Oliver as Doctor Cruces
Wendell Pierce as voice of Death
Lara Rossi as Lady Sybil Ramkin
Joe Vaz as Urdo van Pew

Episodes

Production

Development
The Watch was announced in 2011 as under development by Prime Focus Productions, which previously created three two-part television adaptations of Discworld novels. It was later reported to be produced by Pratchett's own TV production company, Narrativia, which he founded in 2012 and which was led by Rod Brown, the erstwhile head of Prime Focus. In 2012, the series was variously reported to be written – under Pratchett's oversight – by either Terry Jones and Gavin Scott, or by Guy Burt, and to have a budget of either £13 to £15 million, or £26 million, for its projected run of thirteen 60-minute episodes, with Pratchett's daughter Rhianna as co-writer. In October 2016, after Pratchett's death, Rhianna Pratchett said in an interview that the project was still ongoing, but in 2019, announced she had not been involved in the project "for many years".

In March 2018, Deadline Hollywood reported that BBC Studios was developing The Watch as a six-part series and as the basis of a "returnable franchise".  On 30 October 2018, BBC America announced that it had ordered an eight-episode series of The Watch written by Simon Allen together with Joy Wilkinson, Catherine Tregenna, Amrou Al-Khadi and Ed Hime. Hilary Simon and Phil Collinson were the executive producers; the director was Craig Viveiros. Narrativia retained an executive producer credit but was not involved creatively. The series premiered on 3 January 2021.

Casting 
Richard Dormer was cast in the role of Sam Vimes in September 2019. Adam Hugill, Jo Eaton-Kent, Marama Corlett, Lara Rossi, and Sam Adewunmi also joined the cast the same day. The next month, Anna Chancellor and James Fleet joined the cast, as Lord Vetinari and the Archchancellor of Unseen University, respectively, as well as Ingrid Oliver as Doctor Cruces and Ruth Madeley as Throat. In 2019, the series announced it would be recasting several major male characters as women. Joe Vaz was later cast as Urdo van Pew.

Filming 
In September 2014, Pratchett's agent Colin Smythe said that the script was in development and shooting would commence in 2015. After Pratchett's death in 2015, his assistant Rob Wilkins said that pre-production was still ongoing, but that no further announcements would be made until filming had begun. Filming began in Cape Town, South Africa.

Reception

Critical response 
On Rotten Tomatoes, The Watch has a 'rotten' score of 53%, an average rating of 5.9/10, based on 19 reviews. The website's consensus states: "Despite fantastic production design and a solid cast, The Watch simply doesn't capture the wonder, whimsy, and world building of Terry Pratchett's beloved novels." Kiko Martinez of Variety dubbed it a 'tonal mess' and stated, "the show's generic worldbuilding, one-dimensional characterizations and lack of consistent wit will disappoint the kind of niche audience it’s trying to attract." The Hollywood Reporter praised the show's "imaginative world-building" and humour, but said, "the plots are crushingly rote and uninvolving" and found them too familiar. Writing in The Daily Telegraph, Ed Power cautioned that "The Watch takes everything devotees loved about Pratchett: the wryness, the whimsy, the Tolkien-goes-Monty Python setting of Ankh-Morpork. And then chucks it out the window."

Deviations from source material
Even before the series' release it attracted a large amount of attention for departing from the books' more or less medieval origins, delving into "punk rock" visuals, changing the gender, personality, or origins of characters, and removing some characters completely. These changes angered some Discworld fans, which was exacerbated when Simon Allen, head writer for the series, failed to mention Terry Pratchett during his post commemorating the end of filming. After the 9 October 2020 New York Comic Con panel, Rhianna Pratchett stated it shared "no DNA with my father's Watch", and Neil Gaiman compared the series to "Batman if he's now a news reporter in a yellow trenchcoat with a pet bat".

Notes

References

External links
 
 
 

Discworld films and television series
British fantasy television series
2021 British television series debuts
2021 British television series endings
2020s British crime drama television series
BBC America original programming
2020s British television miniseries
2020s British police procedural television series
Television series set on fictional planets
Television shows filmed in South Africa